"Remedy" is a song by American rock band the Black Crowes from their second album, The Southern Harmony and Musical Companion (1992). It appears as the second track on the album. "Remedy" reached number one on the US Billboard Album Rock Tracks chart in May 1992 and stayed there for 11 weeks. On the Billboard Hot 100, the song peaked at number 48. It also reached number 24 on the UK Singles Chart, becoming the band's highest-charting single in the United Kingdom, and entered the top 10 in New Zealand and Norway.

Background
According to lead vocalist Chris Robinson, "Remedy" is a song about freedom, written as a response to the war on drugs, which Robinson considered "silly".

Music video
The song's music video, directed by Pete Angelus, was added to MTV's playlist as an "exclusive" video on the week ending May 2, 1992. By early June, it was on heavy rotation.

Track listings
All songs are written by Chris and Rich Robinson except where noted.

7-inch, cassette, and mini-CD single
 "Remedy" – 5:22
 "Darling of the Underground Press" – 5:33

UK 12-inch and CD single
 "Remedy"
 "Darling of the Underground Press"
 "Time Will Tell"

Charts

References

1992 singles
1992 songs
American Recordings (record label) singles
The Black Crowes songs
Songs about freedom
Songs written by Chris Robinson (singer)
Songs written by Rich Robinson